Extreme Prejudice may refer to:

Extreme Prejudice (film), a 1987 American action film
"Extreme Prejudice" (NCIS), a 2012 episode of NCIS

See also
Project GAMMA#Soldiers tried, for the phrase 'terminate with extreme prejudice'.